The men's 200m Individual Medley (or "I.M.") event at the 2006 Central American and Caribbean Games occurred on Saturday, July 22, 2006 at the S.U. Pedro de Heredia Aquatic Complex in Cartagena, Colombia.

Records at the time of the event were:
World Record: 1:55.94, Michael Phelps (USA), Baltimore, MD, USA, August 9, 2003.
Games Record: 2:05.59, Diego Urretra (Mexico), 2002 Games in San Salvador (Nov.29.2002).

Results

Final

Preliminaries

References

Men's 200 Individual Medley–Prelims results from the official website of the 2006 CACs; retrieved 2009-07-01.
Men's 200 Individual Medley–Final results from the official website of the 2006 CACs; retrieved 2009-07-01.

Medley, Men's 200m